Greece Athena Middle School is a middle school in Greece, New York, a suburb of Rochester; it is located on the 3rd floor of the Athena Complex & covers grades 6–8. This school (along with the high school) was visited by President George W. Bush in 2005. The school is also the location of the Greece Central Performing Arts Center (G.P.A.C.). The high school shares the library together with the middle school, along with the G.P.A.C.

Bus incident

This school was the focus of a widely reported video posted online of male students bullying a school bus monitor in June 2012 called "Making the Bus Monitor Cry". 
The clip shows Karen Klein, who works for the Greece Central School District as a bus monitor, falling victim to hateful comments. The students repeatedly berate Klein, calling her "fat", "ugly", "poor", "stupid", and after she takes her glasses off, a "troll". They verbally abuse her for the duration of the over ten-minute clip, mocking and taunting her (even going so far as to sarcastically sexually harass her), also threatening to urinate on the door of her home. The film further includes threats of physical violence, with one boy stating: "If I stabbed you in the stomach, my knife would go through you like butter." Klein refuses to insult the boys back, trying to admonish them within the first minute: "Unless you have something nice to say, don't say anything at all", but this is rejected with a harsh response of: "How about you shut the fuck up?" It is unknown how long the boys harassed Klein.

Salon referred to it as "YouTube's most evil bullying video", and a collection was taken up to send the victim on vacation which has raised over $700,000 (as of May 2013). Following the upload of the video, the identities and Facebook account URLs of the harassers as well as Klein's were revealed online, including on 4chan.

References

See also
Greece Athena High School

Public middle schools in New York (state)
Schools in Monroe County, New York